Tam Dean Burn (born 1958 in Leith, Scotland) is a Scottish actor who has played a wide range of roles on stage and screen. On television this includes multiple roles on long-running detective series Taggart, youth sci-fi thriller Life Force, and on BBC Scotland's soap opera River City, where he played gangster Thomas McCabe.

Education and family
He trained in Acting at Queen Margaret University, Edinburgh. 
He is the brother of drummer Russell Burn, of Edinburgh band The Fire Engines. Both played together in the band The Dirty Reds.

Politics
In the 1992 General Election, he contested the Glasgow Central seat, standing for the Communist Party of Great Britain (PCC). He received 106 votes, 0.4% of all votes cast, and finished last.

Acting career
His theatrical roles include being the narrator of the 2009 play Year of the Horse, about artist Harry Horse.
He starred on stage in Irvine Welsh's Headspace, in 1997. In 2016 he played Captain Edgar in August Strindberg's Dance of Death at the Citizens Theatre, Glasgow. In 2018 he narrated Tommy Smith's jazz version of Peter and the Wolf by Sergei Prokofieff with text specially adapted by Liz Lochhead. The Scottish National Jazz Orchestra recorded the piece live on 24 February 2018 at Queen's Hall, Edinburgh, Scotland.

Charity work
He is also involved in work for young people. In 2014, he toured Scotland by bicycle, reading all 195 of Julia Donaldson's stories to children. He has campaigned to protect the Children's Wood in Kelvinside, Glasgow from property developers.

2019 stabbing
In March 2019, Burn was stabbed during an assault after appearing at an event at the Scottish Poetry Library in Edinburgh.

Filmography

References

External links
The British Theatre Guide: Tam Dean Burn

Living people
Scottish male stage actors
Scottish male television actors
People educated at Craigmount High School
Scottish communists
1958 births